Glenida is a genus of longhorn beetles of the subfamily Lamiinae.

Species 
Glenida contains the following species:
 Glenida cyaneipennis Gahan, 1888
 Glenida cyaneofasciata Breuning, 1952
 Glenida dauberi Vives & Heffern, 2016
 Glenida izabelae Vives, 2018
 Glenida luteago Holzschuh, 2013
 Glenida nudiceps Holzschuh, 2013
 Glenida puncticollis Breuning, 1961
 Glenida suffusa Gahan, 1888
 Glenida sulphurea Vives & Heffern, 2016

References

Saperdini